Agra Road is a 1957 Bollywood film directed by Ravindra Dave starring Vijay Anand, Shakila, Satish Vyas, Nanda and Dhumal.

Cast
 Vijay Anand as Sunil
 Shakila as Sarita
 Nanda as Seema
 Satish Vyas as Bholu
 Dhumal as Ramu
 Bhagwan Dada as CID Inspector Khanna

Music
Lyrics written by Bharat Vyas and Prem Dhawan

References

External links
 

1957 films
Films scored by Roshan
1950s Hindi-language films
Films directed by Ravindra Dave